Sir Albert Newby Braithwaite  (2 September 1893 – 20 October 1959) was a British Conservative Party politician. He was the son of Albert Braithwaite, one time Lord Mayor of Leeds, and Patti Braithwaite.

He was born in Horsforth, Yorkshire, and educated at Woodhouse Grove School, Leeds Grammar School and the University of Leeds. He served in the Yorkshire Hussars during World War I and was appointed a member of the British Military Commission to the United States. He was awarded a DSO in 1918.

He was elected as Member of Parliament for the Buckrose constituency in the East Riding of Yorkshire at a by-election in 1926, following the resignation of the Conservative MP Guy Gaunt. He held the seat until the 1945 general election, when the Labour Party did not contest the seat and he was defeated by the Liberal Party candidate George Wadsworth. He was knighted in that year and was director of a number of companies.

Braithwaite returned to the House of Commons at a by-election in 1951, as MP for Harrow West, succeeding the Conservative Norman Bower, who had resigned. He held the seat until his death by suicide in 1959, weeks after retaining the seat in that year's general election.

References

External links
 

1893 births
1959 deaths
Alumni of the University of Leeds
British politicians who committed suicide
Companions of the Distinguished Service Order
Conservative Party (UK) MPs for English constituencies
Knights Bachelor
Politicians awarded knighthoods
British Army personnel of World War I
People educated at Woodhouse Grove School
People educated at Leeds Grammar School
UK MPs 1950–1951
UK MPs 1951–1955
UK MPs 1955–1959
UK MPs 1959–1964
Yorkshire Hussars officers
English football chairmen and investors
Chairmen of Leeds United F.C.
Recipients of the Military Cross
20th-century English businesspeople